Javier de Ybarra y Bergé  (2 July 1913 – 22 June 1977) was a Basque industrialist, writer, and politician from Bilbao.

Background
Born into a prominent Bilbao family, Javier Ybarra attended the University of Deusto. During the Spanish Second Republic he was affiliated with the Partido Nacionalista Español and then the monarchist Renovación Española party. He fought and was injured in the Civil War. From 1963 to 1969 he was mayor of Bilbao.

He wrote works related to his experience during the Civil War, history, and politics. He was an executive with firms including Babcock & Wilcox, several banks, and the newspaper El Correo.

On 20 May 1977 Javier Ybarra was kidnapped by renegade members of the Basque separatist group ETA, who entered his home in disguise, bound and gagged members of his family, and took him away in an ambulance. Demanding the release of a number of Basque prisoners (a condition largely met by the Spanish government), his captors later demanded a ransom of one billion pesetas and further prisoner releases. The situation had been complicated by the fact that the group that had kidnapped Ybarra formally renounced their affiliation with the larger ETA organization while holding him and were further disturbed when their leader was arrested in France. The Ybarra family attempted to negotiate with the kidnappers and push back the deadline for payment. The kidnappers failed to respond and on 20 June they announced they had killed Ybarra and sent a map supposedly showing the location of the body. When the Guardia Civil failed to find it, another communication was sent and the body of Javier Ybarra was found near a farmhouse in Navarra. He had been shot in the head and wrapped in a plastic sheet.

Occurring in the immediate aftermath of Spain's first free national elections in forty years, the Ybarra killing provoked widespread condemnation. Following the discovery of the body, the Madrid daily newspaper ABC lead with a full page photo of Ybarra and a statement that "all parties" condemned the "atrocious murder".

See also
List of kidnappings
List of solved missing persons cases
List of unsolved murders

Selected works
De California a Alaska. Historia de Descubrimiento. (1945)
Mi diario de la Guerra de España 1936-1939. (1941)
Politica Nacional en Vizcaya. De la Restauracion a la Republica. (1947)

References

1913 births
1970s missing person cases
1977 deaths
Basque writers
Formerly missing people
Male murder victims
Mayors of Bilbao
Missing person cases in Spain
People from Bilbao
People killed by ETA (separatist group)
Politicians from the Basque Country (autonomous community)
Spanish terrorism victims
University of Deusto alumni
University of Salamanca alumni
Unsolved murders in Spain